The Tapuwae River is a river of the Northland Region of New Zealand's North Island. Most of its length is as an arm of the drowned valley of the Hokianga Harbour, which it reaches from the north close to the small settlement of Tapuwae, five kilometres northwest of Rawene.

See also
List of rivers of New Zealand

References

Hokianga
Rivers of the Northland Region
Rivers of New Zealand